You've Been Framed! is a British television series where viewers could contribute to the programme with their humorous home movies for the entertainment of others. It was produced by ITV Studios. The series ran from 14 April 1990 to 27 August 2022.

History

The show's format is based on the Japanese show Fun TV with Kato-chan and Ken-chan (1986), which was also the basis for America's Funniest Home Videos (1989). The show is also similar in format to a number of other shows worldwide, such as Australia's Funniest Home Video Show (1991). In a deal with various foreign producers of similar shows, many imported clips are used, in exchange for home-grown videos from the United Kingdom.

The show was first commissioned as a pilot and aired on ITV on 14 April 1990 with Jeremy Beadle as the host; a second pilot was also commissioned and aired on 1 September 1990. These featured more audience participation: for example, brief interviews with people who had been featured in clips. Both pilots were a success, with a full series commissioned, which aired on 6 January 1991. The series was referenced in the closing episode of Bottom, "Carnival", in 1995 with the name Jeremy Beadle's Viciously Hilarious Violent Domestic Incidents, for which the lead characters Richie and Eddie tried to film a fake clip they would later submit for it. A section of the show featuring fake submissions, "Named, Framed and Shamed", was a part of the show when Jonathan Wilkes was host. Another parody of the series, You've Been Filmed!, featured as a short clip from the "Clip Round" in a 2009 episode of comedy panel show Shooting Stars, where the comedians from the series appeared in their own clearly faked video clips.

The format has been tweaked in later years, and the studio set and logo changed several times. Lisa Riley took over the role as host from Beadle in 1998. While the programme was presented by Jonathan Wilkes, who replaced Riley in 2003, the studio audience voted for which clip was the best of the night at the end of the show, and the person who sent in the winning clip won £1,000. A segment was also introduced showcasing clips which had obviously been faked, called "Named, Framed and Shamed!", which ended when the studio was ditched in favour of an apartment setting later on while Jonathan Wilkes was still presenting.

This was short lived, and visual continuity was replaced with a narrator, voiced by Harry Hill, in late 2004, which meant that for the first time since the show began, there was no longer a studio set, audience or on-screen personality. Hill provides humorous commentary on the clips via voice-over, which means more clips can be shown. This also uses a short version of a short-lived 2003 intro, which was used in the Jonathan Wilkes era, and was used until 2007.

In the series' ninth year of transmission, ITV started another home videos series, Animals Do the Funniest Things featuring humorous clips of animals, which, although originally produced by LWT when it was first broadcast in 1999, was produced by Granada Television from 2002, therefore becoming Granada's second home video television series after You've Been Framed!.

Submission of clips to You've Been Framed! is free of postage, and in later years, the show began accepting clips via e-mail, and more lately, the inclusion of mobile phone videos; noted on-screen by a small mobile symbol in the corner of the screen, resembling a digital on-screen graphic. Granada Reports newsreader Andrew Brittain was a regular announcer from 1991 until the end of the Jonathan Wilkes era in 2003 when he left Granada Reports.

Nowadays on the show, Hill makes regular obtuse references to the Norfolk market town of Swaffham, in reprisal of the serious injuries he once received in a bizarre bird attack in the town. Additionally, whenever a woman vaguely resembles former host Lisa Riley, Hill refers to her as his "arch-nemesis". The latter is an example of how many of Hill's commentaries refer to people vaguely resembling celebrities as such celerities. Even if someone resembles Hill, he will himself refer to himself as the person in the clip. For a period when Hill's television series Harry Hill's TV Burp was produced, the latter show would be broadcast directly after You've Been Framed! on ITV1, and Hill would occasionally make references to the consecutive scheduling on Harry Hill's TV Burp. The latter show's official book also features a section dedicated to You've Been Framed!, where Hill refers to it as "your second favourite show on television".

Cancellation
On 21 February 2023, it was reported that ITV had axed the show after 33 years being on the air.

Format
During the show, the video clips are played and the people who sent them in receive £250. Just before the advert break, viewer-participation competitions are started, and then are concluded when the programme resumes; examples of these include the "What Happens Next?" competition where the viewers have to guess what happens after a clip is frozen is started, the "Framed Gold Records" competition, where viewers have to guess how many times something can happen before something else happens (for example, "How many people can fall over before a dog gets through a very tight space?"), or "Are you a cry baby? Maybe." competition, in which viewers guess if there will be tears before bedtime, is played. The answer is revealed after the break.

The video clips are normally sorted into separate categories, with examples being categories based on animals, humorous things children say, or embarrassing situations at weddings. Some of the categories let their clips play with humorous commentary from Harry Hill, whilst others have consistent musical backing, so that the clips can be seen as forming a sort of music video. Generally, the soundtrack choice is relevant to the subject of the category (for example, "What's New Pussycat?" once played over a category on cat videos). The musical categories also feature shorter clips than the commentary categories, as the latter will often feature more of what happens before and after the incident in the clip to accommodate Hill's commentary.

Episodes will typically begin with Hill announcing what is "coming up" in the retrospective episode, showing three brief clips, before seguing into the title sequence, although these openings could be considered part of the title sequence. This is a departure to episodes in the Jeremy Beadle/Lisa Riley eras, which used to contain cold openings showing all of a clip without any voice-over.

Sometimes, special editions featuring countdown or "A-Z" lists will be produced, which mostly reuse older clips. There have been approximately 67 specials, and are especially common in the current day.

Transmissions

Series

Jeremy Beadle era (1990–1997)

Lisa Riley era (1998–2002)

Jonathan Wilkes era (2003–2004)

Harry Hill era (2004–2022)

Specials
Throughout its run since its debut in 1990, You've Been Framed! has featured several spin-off specials (often reusing clips from previous shows):

100% You've Been Framed! (22 October 2011)
Best of You've Been Framed! (24 April 2010)
Funniest Ever You've Been Framed! (27 October–1 December 2007)
Ultimate You've Been Framed! (24 September 2011)
I Love YBF! (29 December 2012)
Totally You've Been Framed! (4–25 October 2008, 2009)
The Best of You've Been Framed! (Late 2005)
Very Best of You've Been Framed! (31 December 2006)
The Guide to You've Been Framed! (27 August 2011)
You've Been Framed! A-Z (13 September 2008)
You've Been Framed! A-Z of Christmas (25 December 2002)
You've Been Framed! and Famous (20 December 2009, 8 June 2011, 17 December 2011)
You've Been Framed! and Famous 4 (13 April 2013)
You've Been Framed! Best of the Best (1 March 2014)
You've Been Framed at Christmas! (1991, 1994–95, 1998–2001, 2003–06, 2008, 2009, 2011–14)
You've Been Framed! Calendar Special (23 December 2006)
You've Been Framed! Family Special (27 September 2008)
You've Been Framed! Favourites (27 April 2013)
You've Been Framed! Forever! (20 April 2013)
You've Been Framed! Extreme! (17 April 2010)
You've Been Framed! Full Throttle! (26 May 2012)
You've Been Framed! Funniest 100 (20 September 2008)
You've Been Framed! Harry's Favourites (28 January 2012)
You've Been Framed! Holiday Special (Early 2006)
You've Been Framed! Kids' Special (Early 2005, Early 2007, Early 2010)
You've Been Framed Rides Again! (18 August 2012)
You've Been Framed! Sports' Special (Early 2006)
You've Been Framed! Animal Special (Early 2005, Late 2006)
You've Been Framed! Showbiz Special (January 2005)
You've Been Framed! Top 10s (17 September 2011)
You've Been Framed! The Next Generation (17 December 2011)
You've Been Framed! Top 100 Animals (1 January 2012)
You've Been Framed! Top 100 Holidays (26 January 2013)
You've Been Framed! Top 100 Kids (4 February 2012)
You've Been Framed! Top 100 Talent (2 February 2013)
You've Been Framed! Top 100 Weddings (19 January 2013)
You've Been Framed! Strikes Back! (8 March 2014)
You've Been Framed! Top 100 Senior Moments (15 March 2014)
You've Been Framed! A-Z of Animals (22 March 2014)
You've Been Framed! Top 100 Shockers (29 March 2014)
You've Been Framed! Presents (5 April 2014)
You've Been Framed! Top 100 Sportstars (11 April 2015)
You've Been Framed! A-Z of Growing Up (18 April 2015)
You've Been Framed! Yearbook (25 April 2015)
You've Been Framed! Unleashed! (2 May 2015)
You've Been Framed! Reloaded! (9 May 2015)
You've Been Framed! Hall of Framed (16 May 2015)
You've Been Framed! with Bells on! (25 December 2015)
You've Been Framed! XXL (9 April 2016)
You've Been Framed! Goes Wild! (16 April 2016)
You've Been Framed! Supreme! (23 April 2016)
You've Been Framed! Bites Back! (30 April 2016)
You've Been Framed! Finest (7 May 2016)
You've Been Framed! Bounces Back! (14 May 2016)
You've Been Framed! Harry's Naughty List (25 December 2016)
You've Been Framed! Unchained (7 January 2017)
You've Been Framed! and Fearless! (21 January 2017)
You've Been Framed! King-Size! (28 January 2017)
You've Been Framed! to the Max! (11 February 2017)
You've Been Framed! Unlimited (25 March 2017)
You've Been Framed! Let Loose! (1 April 2017)
You've Been Framed! Unwrapped (23 December 2017)
You've Been Framed! Christmas Crackers (25 December 2020)
You've Been Framed! Goes Large! (2 May 2021)
You've Been Framed! Goes Savage! (8 May 2021)
You've Been Framed! Attacks! (25 September 2021)
You've Been Framed! Unstoppable! (2 October 2021)
You've Been Framed! Uncaged! (9 October 2021)
You've Been Framed! No Limits! (24 October 2021)
You've Been Framed! And Fabulous (30 October 2021)
You've Been Framed! And Furious! (6 August 2022)
You've Been Framed! On a Roll! (13 August 2022)
You've Been Framed! 5-Star Fails (20 August 2022)
You've Been Framed! Super-Size! (27 August 2022)

References

External links
.

1990 British television series debuts
2022 British television series endings
1990s British comedy television series
2000s British comedy television series
2010s British comedy television series
2020s British comedy television series
British television series based on Japanese television series
English-language television shows
ITV comedy
Television series by ITV Studios
Television shows produced by Granada Television
Video clip television series